Johann Wilhelm Andreas Pfaff (5 December 1774 – 26 June 1835), was professor of pure and applied mathematics successively at Dorpat, Nuremberg, Würzburg and Erlangen. He was a brother of Johann Friedrich Pfaff, a mathematician; and of Christian Heinrich Pfaff, a physician and physicist.

References
 

1774 births
1835 deaths
19th-century German mathematicians